Teen Do Paanch   is an Indian mini series / feature film, produced by Smiley Films. It features Shreyas Talpade as Vishal and Bidita Bag as Priyanka as an urban couple lives in Delhi NCR (New Okhla). They want to have a kid but could not conceive after 7 years of married life so they opt for adoption but their lives turn upside down when they end up adopting three kids.Now a couple who wanted one child in their life has three. And after couple of months, excitement or the shock becomes double when the come to know Priyanka is also pregnant. She delivers twins. Now this couple has five kids.

Plot
A couple Vishal and Priyanka is in their 30’s, reside in Noida. Both are educated and professionals. But since some time Priyanka  has left her job to low down the city stress level, as they want to conceive a baby now. Despite having a good health they do not conceive and finally plan to adopt a baby. They go to an orphanage, finalize a baby girl of 4 years and start getting the paperwork done. But  they  soon  come to know that they can’t adopt that baby girl as this girl is one baby out of a triplet and as they have already lost their parents, now orphanage doesn’t want them to get separated furthermore. So they will give this child to a couple who will take all three together otherwise the orphanage can take care of them. Vishal  has to bow down in front of priyanka's wish and ends up adopting all three. Now a couple who wanted one child in their life has three. The story doesn’t end here.  After couple of months, the excitement or the shock becomes double when they come to know that Priyanka is pregnant. She delivers twins. Now this couple has five kids. How these five kids  make them go through all the lows and highs  is the fun filled story of our film "Teen Do Paanch". Do they continue to live with the adopted kids? Or Do the three adopted ones go? This is what forms the rest of the story�

Cast
 Shreyas Talpade as Vishal Sahu
 Bidita Bag as Priyanka Sahu
 Shantanu Anam Kartik
 Brijendra Kala as Gambhir
 Akashdeep Arora as Sushant
 Sheeba Chadhdha as Priyanka's Mother
 Akhilendra Mishra as Madhav Sahu
 Lovleen Mishra as Vishal's Mother
 Shanaya Rai as Divya
 Rannanjay Pratap Singh as Ajay
 Ransh Mathur as Aalok
Priya Gupta as Kanchan
Raj Singh Bhamrah as Chemist

Production
Shooting of the mini-series took place in Noida Gautam Budh Nagar, Uttar Pradesh in 2019 and post production was completed in spring 2020.

Reception

References

External links
 

Indian television series